Ndamase is a South African surname that may refer to:

Tutor Nyangelizwe Vulindlela Ndamase (1921–1997), King in the Western Pondoland, President of Transkei from 1986 to 1994 and descendant of Ndamase 
Pumelele Ndamase, South African politician and former public servant for the ANC